Sheba (from Arabic شبع  šabiʿa = to become sated) is a brand of canned cat food produced by Mars, Incorporated.

In January 2011, Mars Petcare US announced that Sheba would be discontinued and thus will no longer be available for purchase in the United States. A special webpage explained that the decision was based on economic factors: 

As of July 2012, Sheba is again available in the United States. However, it now comes in pull-tab cans as opposed to the former plastic trays.
 
In mid-2014, Sheba once again returned to plastic trays with its Perfect Portions line. One can of Sheba brand cat food contains two servings, but the consumer must manually separate the portions for their pet. The Perfect Portions line reintroduced the plastic packaging by splitting the contents of one can into two separate serving trays, thus eliminating the need for manual separation. The line is priced slightly higher than Sheba canned food.

References 

Mars brands
Cat food brands